Radio 3 net is the former Radio România Tineret (or Radio 3).  More than 20,000 albums are stored on Radio 3 net.  A few of the prominent features available on the website are "1001 Albums You Must Hear Before You Die" and "Search & Play".

Until recently, the director of Radio3Net was Florian Pittiş.

See also
Eastern Bloc information dissemination

References

Article about Radio3net - Florian Pittiş

External links 
Radio 3Net

Radio stations in Romania
Romanian-language radio stations
Eastern Bloc mass media
1963 establishments in Romania
Romanian Radio Broadcasting Company